The Up series''' of documentary films follows the lives of ten males and four females in England beginning in 1964, when they were seven years old. The first film was titled Seven Up!, with later films adjusting the number in the title to match the age of the subjects at the time of filming. The documentary has had nine episodes—one every seven years—thus spanning 56 years. The series has been produced by Granada Television for ITV, which has broadcast all of them except 42 Up (1998), which was broadcast on BBC One. Individual films and the series as a whole have received numerous accolades; in 1991, the then-latest instalment, 28 Up, was chosen for Roger Ebert's list of the ten greatest films of all time.

The children were selected for the original programme to represent the range of socio-economic backgrounds in Britain at that time, with the expectation that each child's social class would determine their future. The first instalment was made as a one-off edition of Granada Television's series, World in Action, directed by Canadian Paul Almond, with involvement by "a fresh-faced young researcher, a middle-class Cambridge graduate", Michael Apted, whose role in the initial programme included "trawling the nation's schools for 14 suitable subjects". About the first programme, Apted has said:It was Paul's film ... but he was more interested in making a beautiful film about being seven, whereas I wanted to make a nasty piece of work about these kids who have it all, and these other kids who have nothing. After Almond's direction of the original programme, director Michael Apted continued the series with new instalments every seven years, filming material from those of the fourteen who chose to participate. The aim of the continuing series is stated at the beginning of 7 Up as: "Why did we bring these together? Because we wanted a glimpse of England in the year 2000. The union leader and the business executive of the year 2000 are now seven years old." The most recent instalment, the ninth, titled 63 Up, premiered in the UK on ITV in 2019. A special episode featuring celebrity fans of the series, 7 Up & Me, also aired on ITV in 2019. Apted is reported to have said, "I hope to do 84 Up when I'll be 99"; however, he died in 2021.

Creation
The first film in the series, Seven Up! (1964), was directed by Paul Almond, and was commissioned by Granada Television as a programme in the World in Action series. From 7 Plus Seven until 63 Up the films were directed by Michael Apted, who had been a researcher on Seven Up! and was involved in finding the original children, with Gordon McDougall. The premise of the film was taken from the Jesuit motto "Give me a child until he is seven and I will give you the man".This is spoken of as being based on a quotation by Francis Xavier, see the wikiquote article on Children. The 1998 edition, 42 Up, was broadcast on BBC One but was still produced by Granada Television.

List of films and premiere dates

Participants
The subjects are first seen on a group visit to London Zoo in 1964, where the narrator announces "We brought these 20 children together for the very first time." The series then follows fourteen of the children: Bruce Balden, Jackie Bassett, Symon Basterfield, Andrew Brackfield, John Brisby, Peter Davies, Susan Davis, Charles Furneaux, Nicholas Hitchon, Neil Hughes, Lynn Johnson, Paul Kligerman, Suzanne Lusk and Tony Walker.

The participants were chosen in an attempt to represent different social classes in Britain in the 1960s. Apted states in the 42 commentary track that he was asked to find children at the extremes. Because the show was not originally intended to become a repeating series, no long-term contract was signed with the participants. According to Apted, participants in the subsequent programmes since Seven Up! have been paid a sum for their appearance in each instalment, as well as equal parts of any prize the film may win. Each subject is filmed in about two days and the interview itself takes more than six hours.

Apted has said that it was a poor decision to include only four female participants.

Andrew
Andrew Brackfield was one of three boys chosen from the same pre-preparatory school in the wealthy London district of Kensington (the other two being Charles and John). The three are introduced in Seven Up! singing "Waltzing Matilda" in Latin. At the age of seven, when asked which newspaper he reads, if any, Andrew stated that he reads The Financial Times (although he later revealed he was in fact just repeating what his father had told him when asked the same question). All three could say which prep schools, public schools and universities they planned to attend (Oxford or Cambridge in all cases); two named the specific Oxbridge college they intended to join.

Andrew's academic career culminated in his studying at Trinity College, Cambridge. Andrew subsequently became a solicitor, married and raised a family. He is the only one of the three Kensington boys to have appeared in all the Up films. Both Andrew and his wife, Jane, are most satisfied with how their children have turned out, followed by their relationship.

Charles
Charles Furneaux did not get into Oxford, saying in 21 he was glad to have avoided the "prep school–Marlborough–Oxbridge conveyor belt" by going to Durham University instead; however, he later attended Oxford as a post-graduate student. Charles has worked in journalism in varying capacities over the years, including as a producer for the BBC, and in the making of documentary films, including Touching the Void. When contacted to appear in 28, Charles declined; a subsequent phone conversation during which Apted, by his own admission, "went berserk", destroyed the relationship to the degree that Charles has refused to participate in all subsequent films, and even attempted to force Granada to remove archive images of him from the films in which he did not appear.

During an on-stage interview at London's National Film Theatre in December 2005, Apted alleged that Charles had attempted to sue him when he refused to remove Charles from the archive sequences in 49. Apted also commented on the irony that as a documentary maker himself, Charles was the only one who refused to continue.

By the time of 56, all references to Charles had been removed save for fleeting glimpses of joint shots with Andrew and John.

John
John Brisby KC, who was vocal on politics by 14, attended Oxford and became a barrister. He married Claire, the daughter of Sir Donald Logan, a former ambassador to Bulgaria. Brisby devotes himself to charities related to Bulgaria, and hopes to reclaim family land there that had been nationalised. He is a great-great-grandson of the first Prime Minister of Bulgaria, Todor Burmov.

Brisby said in 35 that he only does the films to give more publicity to his chosen charities. In 56, he criticised Apted's decision to originally portray him as part of the "privileged upper class". He disclosed that his father had died when he was 9 and his mother worked to put him through elite private schools; he had attended Oxford on a scholarship. As of 56, he remains a litigator who feels very blessed in almost all aspects of his life.

Suzy
Suzanne (Suzy) Lusk comes from a wealthy background and was first filmed at an independent London day school. Her parents divorced around the time of 7 Plus Seven. She then dropped out of school at the age of 16, deciding to travel to Paris. By 21, she had formed a strong negative opinion about marriage and being a parent, though this soon changed dramatically. By 28, she was married with two sons, and credited her marriage with bringing her the optimism and happiness that was not evident in the earlier films. Her husband, Rupert Dewey, is a solicitor in Bath and they have three children, two boys and a girl. She became a bereavement counsellor. In 7 Plus Seven, she stated that she thought Apted's project was pointless and silly, a point that she restated in 21. At 49 she was convinced that she would not participate again, but in 56 she admitted that she felt an obligation to the project regardless of how she feels about it. Suzy did not appear in 63 aside from footage from previous films.

Jackie
Jackie Bassett was one of three girls (the others being Lynn and Sue) who were chosen from the same primary school, in a working-class neighbourhood of east London. She eventually went to a comprehensive school and married at age 19. Jackie went through several different jobs, divorced, remarried and moved to Scotland, divorced again and raised her three sons as a single parent. As of 56, she had been receiving disability benefit for 14 years, due to rheumatoid arthritis. Her family remains close and lives near each other in Scotland.

Lynn
Lynn Johnson, after attending the same primary school as Jackie and Sue, went on to attend a grammar school. She married at 19, had two daughters, and became a children's librarian at 21. She later became a school librarian and remained in that position until being made redundant due to budget cuts. At 56, she continued to believe her career as a librarian was of great value and it helped define her life. She was a doting grandmother with three grandchildren, and still married to her husband Russ, whom she considered her soulmate. In May 2013, after a short illness, Lynn became the first participant to die. She served as Chair of Governors of St Saviour's primary school in Poplar, London, for over 25 years; after her death, a section of the school library was renamed in her memory.

In 63, after much of the earlier footage, particularly from 56, Russ and her daughters recall her death and discuss its effect on them.

Sue
Susan (Sue) Davis attended the same primary school as Jackie and Lynn and following that attended a comprehensive school. Sue married at 24 and had two children before getting divorced. She has been engaged to her current boyfriend, Glenn, for 21 years as of 63. She works as a university administrator for Queen Mary, University of London, despite not having gone to university herself, and is fond of amateur dramatics. By 63, she is looking forward to retiring in the near future.

Tony
Tony Walker was chosen from a primary school in the East End of London and was introduced along with his classmate Michelle, who Douglas Keay, the narrator, stated was Tony's "girlfriend". At age 7, Michelle described Tony as a "monkey". He wanted to be a jockey at 7 and was at a stable training as one by 14. By 21 his chance had come and gone after riding in three races before giving it up. He was proud to have competed against Lester Piggott. He then gained "the Knowledge", and made a comfortable life for himself and his family as a London taxi driver. His later dream of becoming an actor has met with modest success; he has had small parts as an extra (almost always playing a cabbie) in several TV programmes since 1986, including The Bill and twice in EastEnders, most recently in 2003. His wife Debbie was carrying their third child in 28, and she reveals in 35 that she lost that baby but has since had another; she admits that losing their third child placed a tremendous stress on their relationship. Tony admitted in 35 that being in a monogamous relationship was becoming a strain, and by 42, he had actually committed adultery, though he and his wife have got past it and are still together. By 42, he had moved to Essex, and by 49 owned two homes, including a holiday home in Spain. In 63, he and his wife had settled in the English countryside.

Paul
Paul Kligerman was at a charity-based boarding school at 7, his parents having divorced and he having been left with his father. Soon after Seven Up! his father and stepmother moved the family to Australia, where he has remained in the Melbourne area ever since. By 21, he had long hair and a girlfriend whom he is still married to. After leaving school he was employed as a bricklayer and later set up his own business. In 49, he is working for a sign-making company. In 21, 49 and 63, Paul was reunited with Symon, who had attended the same boarding school; portions of their time together are included in all three films. By 56, Paul had started work at a local retirement village with his wife Susan. He does odd jobs and maintenance of the small units and gardens.

Symon
Symon Basterfield, given name also spelt Simon in previous films, chosen from the same charity home as Paul, is the only mixed-race participant. He never got to know his black father, and had left the charity home to live with his white mother by the time of the 7 Plus Seven filming; her depression is alluded to as the cause for his being in the home. As filming for 35 took place, he was going through a divorce from his first wife and mother of his five children, and he elected not to participate. Symon returned for 42 and 49, remarried with one son and one stepdaughter. In 49, he and his wife had become foster parents. By 56, he regretted his lack of formal education, which he felt limited his income over the years. He remains happily married and looks forward to the next chapters of his life. In 63, his relationship with his children from his first marriage is mending and he has 10 grandchildren.

Nick
William Nicholas (Nick) Hitchon was raised on a small farm in Arncliffe, a tiny village in the Yorkshire Dales. He was educated in a one-room school four miles' walk from his home, and later at a boarding school. He went to Oxford University (where, he mentions in 63 Up, Theresa May was a contemporary) and then moved to the United States to work as a nuclear physicist. He married Jackie, another British immigrant, who participated in 28 but was displeased with how her comments were received by viewers, many of whom apparently concluded that the marriage was doomed. She declined to appear in 35 and 42. By 49, the couple had divorced and Nick had remarried, this time to Cryss Brunner, ten years his senior and at that time taught in Minneapolis. Nick has been a professor at the University of Wisconsin–Madison in the Electrical & Computer Engineering Department since 1982. Nick appeared as a guest on NPR's quiz show Wait Wait... Don't Tell Me aired 21 June 2014, and spoke briefly about his participation in the Up series. By 63, Nick developed a cancerous mass in his throat and had recently lost his father, leading him to contemplate mortality and the future of his family once he is gone.

Peter
Peter Davies went to the same middle-class Liverpool suburban school as Neil, who, like Peter, wanted to be an astronaut. Peter drifted through university, and by age 28, he was an underpaid and seemingly uninspired school teacher. Peter dropped out of the series after 28, following a tabloid press campaign against him after he criticised the government of Margaret Thatcher in his interview. The director's commentary for 42 revealed that he later divorced, took up study of the law, became a lawyer, remarried, had children and moved back to Liverpool. He returned in 56 to promote his band, the Liverpool-based country-influenced The Good Intentions; the group was still together, although one member had died, in 63.

Neil
Neil Hughes, from a Liverpool suburb, turned out to be perhaps the most unpredictable of the group. At seven he was a happy child, funny and full of life and hope, but by 7 Plus Seven, he was nervous and stressed. By 21, he was living in a squat in London, having dropped out of Aberdeen University after one term, and was finding work as he could on building sites. During the interview he was in an agitated state. At 28, he was still homeless, although now in Scotland; by 35, he was living in a council house in the Shetland Islands off the north coast of Scotland, writing and appearing in the local pantomime. By 42, he was living in Bruce's apartment in London and Bruce had become a source of emotional support. He was involved in local council politics, as a Liberal Democrat in the London Borough of Hackney, and had completed a Bachelor of Arts degree from the Open University. He was first elected to Wick ward on Hackney London Borough Council in 1996, and resigned his seat in 2000.

By 49, he was a district councillor in the Eden district of Cumbria, in North West England. He was first elected for Shap on Eden District in 2003. He was a candidate for Eden Lakes on Cumbria County Council in 2005 and 2009, coming second to the Conservative candidate on both occasions. In 2013, following new division boundaries, Neil was elected to Eden Lakes, and did not stand again for Shap. He was re-elected to Eden Lakes in 2017.

He stood as the Liberal Democrat candidate for Stockton North in the 2005 general election and for Carlisle in the 2010 general election, finishing third on both occasions. Neil stood for Penrith and the Border—which covers the same area he represents as a councillor—at the 2015 and 2017 general elections. In 2015, he came fourth, whilst in 2017, he came third. At the 2019 general election, Hughes contested the Labour–Conservative marginal seat of Workington in Cumbria. Finishing fourth, he increased the party's vote share, but lost his deposit.

By 63, Neil has married; however, he and his wife have separated due to unspecified difficulties. He is a lay preacher, district councillor and also has a home in France.

Bruce
Bruce Balden, as a child, was concerned with poverty and racial discrimination and wanted to become a missionary. He was attending a prestigious boarding school. At the age of seven, he said that his greatest desire was to see his father, a soldier in Southern Rhodesia, and he seemed brave though a little abandoned. Bruce studied mathematics at Oxford University and used his education to teach children in the East End of London and Sylhet, Bangladesh. Before 42, he married, and Apted broke the seven-year structure to film Bruce's wedding, which was also attended by Neil. Eventually becoming worn down by teaching in the East End, Bruce found work at St Albans School, Hertfordshire, a prestigious public school. Between 42 and 49, he had two sons and was happily married to a fellow teacher. In 56, he admits he still has a hard time expressing his innermost feelings, in particular to his wife, but is a happily devoted father and husband. Still teaching at a prestigious public school, he has no regrets at this point in his life about the development of his career.

Participation record

Motifs
A number of themes have appeared repeatedly over the course of the series. Questions about religion, family, class, happiness and psychological state dominate many of the interviews, as well as inquiries about the worries and concerns subjects have for their future. In addition, questions often take a personal tone, with Apted noting that viewers often respond to his questioning of Neil's sanity or his perception of Tony's success in life as being too personal, but that he has been able to do this because of the friendship he has developed with the subjects over the course of their lives.

Critical responses, including awards

The series has received high praise over the years. Roger Ebert said that it is "an inspired, even noble, use of the film medium", that the films "penetrate to the central mystery of life", and that the series is among his top ten films of all time. Michael Apted won an Institutional Peabody Award in 2012 for his work on the Up series. In a list of the 100 Greatest British Television Programmes drawn up by the British Film Institute in 2000, voted for by industry professionals, 28 Up placed 26th.

The Up series has been criticised by both ethnographers and the subjects themselves for its editing style. Mitchell Duneier has pointed out that Apted has the ability to assert causal relationships between a character's past and present that might not actually exist. Apted has acknowledged this fact, pointing out that in 21 Up he believed Tony would soon be in prison, so he filmed him around dangerous areas for use in later films. Apted also portrayed the troubled marriage of Nick earlier in the film, although his time frame for anticipating their divorce was premature. Apted has stated in interviews that his "tendency to play God" with the interviews was "foolishness and wrong." In 21 Up, the women participants were offended that all the questions concerned domestic affairs, marriage and children, rather than politics. A New Yorker article by Rebecca Mead noted "[Apted] can be unbearably patronizing toward his subjects, particularly the working-class women, while he sets his more affluent participants up to look ludicrous." However, she did note that "To his credit, Apted has shown participants arguing back against the show's premise and against his own prejudices. One of the most exhilarating moments in the series occurs in "49 Up", when Jackie [...] rounds on Apted, castigating him for his decades of underestimating her. Apted's implied humility is ultimately, if belatedly, Jackie's vindication."

Influence on participants
Over the course of the project the programme has in varying degrees had a direct effect on the lives of its participants. The series participants often speak of the series having become popular enough that they were recognised in public. For instance, in 56 Up, Tony related an anecdote about giving a ride to Buzz Aldrin, and being surprised when a passerby asks him, not Aldrin, for an autograph.

The participants' opinions regarding being involved in the series are often mentioned, and varied greatly among the participants. John refers to the programme as a poison pill that he is subjected to every seven years, while Paul's wife credits the series for keeping their marriage together. Michael Apted has commented that one of the big surprises between filming 42 Up and 49 Up was the impact of reality television—i.e., that the subjects wanted to talk about their contribution to the series in the light of this genre.

In addition, there have been instances of the interactions of participants being engineered by the programme's producers. For instance, Paul and Nick were flown back to England at Granada's expense for the filming of 35 Up and 42 Up respectively. In addition, Paul was flown back again for 49 Up and visited Symon; Symon and his wife were in turn flown to Australia to visit Paul in 63 Up. As well, Bruce was affected by Neil's plight and offered him temporary shelter in his home shortly before 42 Up, allowing Neil time to get settled in London; despite Neil's eccentricities during his two-month stay, they clearly remained friends, with Neil later giving a reading at Bruce's wedding. In 56 Up, Suzy and Nick are interviewed together, having become friends due to their shared rural upbringing.

Cultural and broader influences
The series has also been satirised; The Simpsons 2007 episode "Springfield Up" is narrated by an Apted-like filmmaker who depicts the past and current lives of a group of Springfield residents he has revisited every eight years. The "37 Up" segment of Tracey Ullman: A Class Act, first aired in 1992, parodies the series. Harry Enfield parodied the series in a spoof titled '2 Up' with his characters Tim Nice-but-Dim and Wayne Slob. The Australian comedy TV series The Late Show satirised the series with a version in which participants were interviewed every seven minutes.

The original hypothesis of Seven Up! was that class structure is so strong in the UK that a person's life path would be set at birth. The producer of the original programme had at one point thought to line the children up on the street, have three of them step forward and narrate "of these twenty children, only three will be successful" (an idea which was not used). The idea of class immobility held up in most, but not all, cases as the series has progressed. The children from the working classes have by and large remained in those circles, though Tony seems to have become more middle class. Apted has said that one of his regrets is that they did not take feminism into account, and consequently had fewer girls in their study and did not select them on the basis of any possible careers they might choose.

Although it began as a political documentary, the series has become a film of human nature and existentialism. In the director's commentary for 42 Up, Apted comments that he did not realise the series had changed tone from political to personal until 21 Up, when he showed the film to American friends who encouraged him to submit it (successfully) to American film festivals. Apted also comments that this realisation was a relief to him and allowed the films to breathe a little more.

Similar documentaries
 Multinational
 I Am Eleven (2012) by Geneviève Bailey, features participants from Africa, Asia, Australia, Europe, and North America.
 Australia
 Gillian Armstrong made a series following three girls/women from 1975 to 2009:
 Smokes and Lollies (1975)
 14's Good, 18's Better (1980)
 Bingo, Bridesmaids & Braces (1988)
 Not Fourteen Again (1996)
 Love, Lust & Lies (2009)
Belgium
 Jambers, 1980–1990. Two-part documentary by TV journalist Paul Jambers on Flemish public TV channel about secondary school students in Kapellen, near Antwerp.
Canada
 Talk 16 (1991) and Talk 19 (1993), directed and written by Janis Lundman and Adrienne Mitchell of Back Alley Film Productions.
Czech Republic – by Helena Třeštíková.René, a single-episode portrait of a man over 20 years, starting in the late 1980s. 
FranceQue deviendront-ils ? (What Will They Become) from Michel Fresnel (1984–1996)
GermanyDie Kinder von Golzow (The Children of Golzow) by Winfried Junge, set in former East Germany as well as in unified Germany after 1990 (1961–2006)Berlin – Ecke Bundesplatz (Berlin – On the Corner of Federation Square) (1985) by Detlef Gumm and Hans-Georg Ullrich. The documentary follows individuals, families or groups of related people in separate episodes of around one hour in length each. The sequel was broadcast in four seasons on 3sat.
1999: Der Prominenten-Anwalt (The Society Lawyer), Bäckermeister im Kiez (Neighborhood Baker), Wilmersdorfer Witwen (Widows in Wilmersdorf), Die nächste Generation (The Next Generation), Die Alleinerziehende (The Single Mother), Der Aussteiger (The Dropout)
2001: Grenzgänger (Tightrope-walkers), Solisten (Nonconformists)
2004: Kinder! Kinder! (Children! Children!), Alte Freunde (Old Friends), Vereinigungen (Associations), Recht und Ordnung (Law and Order)
2009: Mütter und Töchter (Mothers and Daughters), Die Aussteiger (The Off-beats), Schön ist die Jugend... (Youth is Beautiful...), Die Köpcke-Bande (The Köpcke Gang), Der Yilmaz-Clan (The Yilmaz Clan)
DenmarkÅrgang 0 (Generation 0) by TV2 (2000) – The show follows the children, born in the year 2000, from birth.
 Italy
 Intervista a mia madre (Interview to my mother) (2000) and Le cose belle (The beautiful things) (2014) by Agostino Ferrente and Giovanni Piperno: the documentaries show two periods in the life of a group of teenagers living in Naples.
 Japan
 Kimiko Fukuda made a series following thirteen children living in different parts of Japan:
 Sekai no 7 sai Nippon (World 7 years in Japan,7 Up Japan)(1992)
 14 sai ni narimashita Kodomotachi 7nen gotono seicho kiroku (I turned 14 Growth records every 7 years,14 Up Japan)(1999)
 7nen goto no seicho kiroku 21sai Kazoku soshite watashi (Growth records every 7 years 21 Family and me,21 Up Japan) (2006)
 7nen goto no seicho kiroku 28sai ni narimashista(Growth records every 7 years I turned 28 ,28 Up Japan) (2013)
 7nen goto no seicho kiroku 35sai ni narimashista(Growth records every 7 years I turned 35 ,35 Up Japan)  (2020)
 Joe, Tomorrow (2015), by Junji Sakamoto, follows the life of boxer Joichiro Tatsuyoshi.
The Netherlands
Bijna volwassen (Almost Grown-up) (1982) – follows a group of 17–18-year-olds.
Bijna 30 (Almost 30) (1994)
Bijna 40 (Almost 40) (2005)
South Africa – by Angus Gibson
7 Up in South Africa (1992)
14 Up in South Africa (1999)
21 Up South Africa (2006)
28 Up South Africa (2013)
Spain
Generació D by TV3 (1989–2019, ongoing). About a group of children from Catalonia.
Sweden
Jordbrosviten by Rainer Hartleb. About a group of children from Jordbro, a suburb of Stockholm.
 Från en barndomsvärld (From a Childhood World) (1973)
 Barnen från Jordbro (Children from Jordbro) (1982)
 Tillbaka till Jordbro (Jordbro Revisited) (1988)
 Det var en gång... en liten flicka (Once Upon a Time... there was a Little Girl) (1992)
 En pizza i Jordbro (A Pizza in Jordbro) (1994)
 Nya barn i Jordbro (New Children in Jordbro) (2001)
 Alla mår bra (All are doing Well) (2006)
 Student 92 by Gunilla Nilars. About a group of high school graduates of '92, class of E3b from Gångsätra gymnasium in Lidingö, interviewed every five years for a total of twenty years.
 Student 92...men sen då? (High school graduate of '92...and then what?) (1997)
 Student 92, tio år senare (High school graduate of '92, ten years later) (2002)
 Student 92, femton år senare (High school graduate of '92, fifteen years later) (2007)
 Student 92, tjugo år senare (High school graduate of '92, twenty years later) (2012)
USSR/Russia/Former Soviet republics – by Sergei Miroshnichenko and Jemma Jupp.
Age 7 in the USSR (1991)
14 Up Born in the USSR (1998) (this won an International Emmy)
Born in the USSR: 21 Up (2005)
Born in the USSR: 28 Up (2012)
United Kingdom
A new version of the Up series titled Up New Generation began with 7Up 2000 (2000, Julian Farino) and continued with 14 Up 2000 in 2007, 21 Up: New Generation in 2014 and 28 Up: Millennium Generation in 2021.
Child of Our Time (2000–2020), a BBC/The Open University documentary series following the lives of 25 children who were born around the turn of the millennium
Born to be Different, a Channel 4 documentary series which follows six children who were born with a disability
United States
Age 7 in America (1991) directed by Phil Joanou
14 Up in America (1998)
21 Up in America (2006) directed by Christopher Dillon Quinn
All's Well and Fair (2012) directed by Luci Westphal. Released as a web series in 2012. 
Married in America (2002), also by Michael Apted

Further reading and viewing
 Review of 63 Up in The New York Times

See also
 "Springfield Up", an 18th season episode of The Simpsons that parodies the Up series
 Boyhood, an American drama film shot over twelve years as its young actor aged from 6 to 18 years
 Dunedin Multidisciplinary Health and Development Study, a University of Otago research project since 1972
 British birth cohort studies continuing, multi-disciplinary longitudinal surveys monitoring the development of babies born in the UK during specific weeks

References

External links

P.O.V. 49 Up - PBS's site dedicated to the film
 63 Up website

1964 British television series debuts
1960s British documentary television series
1970s British documentary television series
1980s British documentary television series
1990s British documentary television series
2000s British documentary television series
2010s British documentary television series
British film series
Biographical documentary films
Documentary films about adolescence
Documentary films about children
Documentary film series
English-language television shows
Film series introduced in 1964
Films directed by Paul Almond
Films directed by Michael Apted
ITV (TV network) original programming
Television shows produced by Granada Television
Television series by ITV Studios
Ageing
Cohort studies